Walmer Estate is a suburb of Cape Town in the Western Cape province of South Africa. It lies at the foot of Table Mountain and is bordered to the south by Table Mountain National Park, to the north-east by Woodstock and to the west by Zonnebloem. It covers an area of 0.47 km2.

History 
Walmer Estate was part of the former District Six area of Cape Town, which was subject to forced removals under the now repealed Group Areas Act.

Demographics 
The current population of Walmer estate is cosmopolitan, with a population of 17.9% Black African, 55.6% Coloured, 10% Indian/Asian and 8.8% White. The main languages spoken are English and Afrikaans.

The suburb has been experiencing urban renewal.

Education 
The suburb is home to the Walmer Estate Primary School, Walmer Secondary School and the Holy Cross RC Primary School.

Religion 
Places of worship in the area include The Parish of Saint Bartholomew, St Marks Church, and the Walmer Estate Mosque.

References

Suburbs of Cape Town